The Resistants, also known as Mutant Force, are a supervillain group appearing in American comic books published by Marvel Comics. They were originally the second incarnation of the Brotherhood of Mutants, but have become completely independent of the other incarnations of that group. They were originally gathered by Magneto.

Fictional team history
The mutant Magneto was the founder of the original Brotherhood of Evil Mutants. Over the years, the original Brotherhood had disbanded, so Magneto decided to create a new Brotherhood. He recruited five young mutants and trained them to become the new Brotherhood. The five mutants were sent to capture Mister One, a mutant who was small enough to enter and operate a miniature spacecraft Magneto had discovered. Their plans were foiled by Captain America and Magneto left the team.

Their next employer, the Mandrill, renamed the team Mutant Force, a name they would commonly be associated with. As Mutant Force the team repeatedly came into conflict with the Defenders. During this period they were employed by both the US government and the Secret Empire. Peeper, the usual leader, was absent for their first mission with the Secret Empire. As Secret Empire operatives, they were led by Mad Dog.

The Red Skull offered the team funding and renamed them the Resistants. As the Resistants, the team fought against the Mutant Registration Act. During this time, Slither wasn't part of the team, but many mutants joined the team including Mist Mistress and Mentallo (now calling himself Think Tank). As the Resistants, the team would fight against several superheroes, including their original enemy Captain America. Eventually most members would leave. Slither rejoined and the team retook the name Mutant Force. The team disbanded shortly afterwards, most members going their own way.

After the events of "Decimation", some members of the Mutant Force have been depowered while others maintained their mutant abilities.

Members
 Burner/Crucible (Byron Calley): Has the ability to create heat and fire from his hands.
 Lifter/Meteorite (Ned Lathrop): Can manipulate gravity, increasing his density, durability and strength and negate gravity on other objects, making them fly.
 Mist Mistress: Can create and control various types of mists like knock-out gas, acidic mists and toxic mists. Depowered. 
 Peeper/Occult (Peter Quinn): Has increased visual abilities and can fire beams of energy from his eyes. Killed by Predator X.
 Quill: Body was covered with sharp quills that he could fire at opponents. Depowered.
 Rust: Could fire blasts from his hands that corroded metal. Presumed killed by Captain America (Walker).
 Shocker/Paralyzer (Randall Darby): Could fire electric blasts from his hands. His hands and feet were cyborg crab-like claws. After the team disbanded, he left for Genosha to join Magneto. Depowered.
 Slither (Aaron Salomon): Has a snake-like body, allowing him to constrict opponents with great force. He also has minor superhuman strength. Slither left when the team became the Resistants, but returned when they became Mutant Force again. Slither was briefly a member of the Serpent Society on occasion and the Fangs.
 Think Tank (Marvin Flumm): Better known as the telepath Mentallo. He was only a member of the Resistants for a short time. Currently the Minister of Public Affairs of A.I.M.

There are also many unnamed members.

In other media
The Mutant Force appeared in the X-Men episode "Sanctuary". They are among the mutants that move to Asteroid M. The Mutant Force members seen there are Lifter, Peeper, Shocker, and Slither.

Notes
 The original members were all created by Jack Kirby. Magneto and Think Tank were created by Stan Lee and Jack Kirby. Mist Mistress, Quill and Rust were created by Mark Gruenwald, Kieron Dwyer, and Al Milgrom.

References

External links
 Mutant Force at Marvel Appendix
 Resistance at Marvel Appendix

Marvel Comics mutants
Marvel Comics supervillain teams
Characters created by Jack Kirby